Andobana is a genus of moths of the family Noctuidae.

Species
 Andobana duchesnei (Viette, 1959)
 Andobana multipunctata (Druce, 1899)

References
 Andobana at Markku Savela's Lepidoptera and Some Other Life Forms
 Natural History Museum Lepidoptera genus database

Acronictinae
Noctuoidea genera